Sir Matthew Dudley, 2nd Baronet (1 October 1661 – 14 April 1721) was an English politician.

Dudley was the son of Sir William Dudley, 1st Baronet, of Clopton, Northamptonshire. He was the High Sheriff of Northamptonshire for 1684, MP for Northampton from 1703 to 1705 and MP for Huntingdonshire from 1713 to 1715. He was elected a Fellow of the Royal Society in 1703.

Dudley died in 1721. he had married Mary, daughter of Henry O'Brien, 7th Earl of Thomond. He had 4 sons (3 of whom predeceased him) and a daughter. He was succeeded by his surviving son, Sir William Dudley, 3rd and last Baronet.

References

1661 births
1721 deaths
People from North Northamptonshire
17th-century English people
18th-century English people
Baronets in the Baronetage of England
Fellows of the Royal Society
English MPs 1702–1705
British MPs 1713–1715
Members of the Parliament of Great Britain for English constituencies
High Sheriffs of Northamptonshire